KN-25 is a designation given to a North Korean tactical ballistic missile.

Design
The KN-25 is officially described to be a "super-large calibre" multiple launch rocket system, but the larger size and greater range of the missile compared to traditional rocket artillery led the United States Forces Korea (USFK) to categorize it as an SRBM, and it flies on a controlled ballistic trajectory. Missiles are estimated to be 600 mm in diameter, 8.2 meters long, and weigh 3,000 kg; they are mounted on a four-tube Tatra 813 8×8 wheeled transporter-erector-launcher (TEL). They have an unspecified guidance system and have six rotating rear fins with four moving forward fins, which likely provide the attitude control of the rocket. It is a battlefield weapon, suitable for deployment at battalion-level to attack enemy rear-echelon targets out to 380 km with a conventional blast-fragmentation warhead. In October 2022, the KN-25 was included in a statement among other missiles North Korea claimed were part of its capability to deliver tactical nuclear weapons. At a parade in February 2023, the KN-25 was included among other missiles which North Korean press collectively referred to these as "tactical nuclear weapons operation units."

The six rotating rear fins are an unusual feature for rocket artillery, a considerable innovation of North Korea. Their purpose is to provide stabilisation of the rocket while in flight, compared to other rocket artillery rounds, which are usually spin stabilised by rotating the entire body. This method of stabilisation creates a more favourable environment for the guidance systems, as the rest of the missile does not rotate. It is possible that the missile will be stabilised through rolling the missile when it enters the upper atmosphere, where the smaller control fins are unable to function optimally, and then stopping the spin as it re-enters into denser air.

The missile possibly derives from the OTR-21 Tochka/KN-02 Toksa, which has a similarly sized motor, at 62 cm diameter. Connecting three such motor segments would result in a length similar to that of the KN-25 rocket. The KN-25 is likely an indigenous project, as media coverage of this missile emphasis its research, using words such as 'Juche projectiles' to describe it, unlike the KN-23.

KN-25 has 300 kilogram heavy warhead and circular error probable accuracy of 80 to 90 meters.

30 TELs were presented as a gift to the plenary meeting of the Worker's Party of Korea on January 1, 2023, with Kim Jong-un attending and making a speech. The system was described as 'unprecedented', in both the munitions industry as having no equal and its presentation, being on the lawn of the party central committee.

Cruise missile launcher
On 13 September 2021, North Korea announced they had conducted successful flight tests of a land attack cruise missile (LACM) over the past two days. The mobile launcher appears to be the same vehicle used to carry KN-25 "oversized" rockets, both weapons likely being similar in diameter. Its was later revealed to be named the Hwasal-1/2.

Tests

See also
KN-02
KN-09

References

External links
KN-25. Military-Today

Tactical ballistic missiles
Ballistic missiles of North Korea
Tactical ballistic missiles of North Korea
Wheeled self-propelled rocket launchers
Multiple rocket launchers of North Korea